Notoriety is an Iranian movie directed by Masoud Dehnamaki in 2013.

Subject
This movie is about theological issues especially enjoining good and forbidding wrong.

Summary
A beautiful girl named Afsaneh who is living in Downtown has economic problems, and her family offers her to marry to their landlord whose wife had died. One night, she went to see a clergyman (Akbar Abdi). She was tired, and the clergyman let her sleep there for a night. Next morning, clergyman's students see the girl's shoes and think that they have slept together. Gossips spread through the city and the man is forced to leave town.

At the end people find out the true story and ask the man to come back.

References
 

2013 films
2013 drama films
Iranian drama films
2010s Persian-language films